Anna Johansson-Visborg (10 November 1876 – 7 August  1953) was a Swedish trade union leader, women's rights activist and politician with the Swedish Social Democratic Party.

Biography 
Anna Sofia Johansson-Visborg was born to a farming family at Beateberg parish in Töreboda Municipality in  Västra Götaland County, Sweden. She was married in 1919 to  Sven Gylfe Visborg (1885–1957). She worked as a domestic servant in Gothenburg from 1893–1897 and a brewery worker in Stockholm from 1897–1904, and an office clerk at an insurance company from 1904–1918. 

In 1914, she began her own real estate business and became a cinema owner which resulted in considerable wealth. This led to the foundation of the Anna Johansson-Visborg Foundation with the task of providing full-time or partially-needed housing in Stockholm.

Policial career
In 1901, she was one of the founders of the first Swedish trade union for brewery workers. Johansson-Visborg was chairperson in the Swedish Industrial Brewery Workers' Union from 1904–1953; chairperson of the Cooperative Women's Association from 1907–1938; chairperson of the Stockholm central worker's unions women's branch from 1911–1953; member of the Stockholm City Council from 1916–1950; member of the board of the Social Democratic Women in Sweden from 1920–1924; member of the board of the Stockholm Municipality from 1929–1933.

She was also a leading force in the Social Democratic women suffrage movement. While the Social Democratic women did not have their own separate women's suffrage organisation, they worked actively alongside the National Association for Women's Suffrage. As a politician and activist, she always worked to abolish all legislation opposite to gender equality.

Johansson-Visborg was described as brusque, energetic and with a great administrative talent: her lack of diplomacy somewhat damaged her politician career, but she was also appreciated for it, and referred to by her followers as "Brewer-Anna".

Awards 
She was awarded the Illis Quorum in 1945.

References

Other sources 
 Ragnar Amenius. Anna S Johansson-Visborg  (urn:sbl:12170, Svenskt biografiskt lexikon, hämtad 2015-05-30)

Related reading 
Marika Lindgren Åsbrink, Anne-Marie Lindgren (2007) Systrar, kamrater! : arbetarrörelsens kvinnliga pionjärer (StockholmIdé & Tendens)

Further reading

External links
Anna Johansson-Visborgs Stiftelse website

1876 births
1953 deaths
People from Töreboda Municipality
Politicians from Stockholm
Socialist feminists
20th-century Swedish businesspeople
Swedish landowners
Swedish women's rights activists
Swedish Social Democratic Party politicians
Swedish trade unionists
20th-century women landowners
19th-century Swedish women politicians
19th-century Swedish politicians
20th-century Swedish women politicians
20th-century Swedish politicians
Recipients of the Illis quorum
20th-century Swedish businesswomen